Dame Sue Lascelles Carr,  (born 1 September 1964), styled The Rt Hon Lady Justice Carr, is an English judge, who has served as a Lady Justice of Appeal since 2020.

Origins and education
Carr is the daughter of Richard Carr and Edda Harvey (née Armbrust), and was educated at Wycombe Abbey School and at Trinity College, Cambridge.

Legal career
Carr was called to the bar in 1987 where she practised from 4 New Square Chambers and became a Queen's Counsel in 2003. In 2009 Carr was appointed a Recorder, and was approved to serve as a deputy High Court judge.

Carr was chairman of the Professional Negligence Bar Association in 2007 and 2008 and chairman of the Conduct Committee of the Bar Standards Board from 2008 to 2011. In April 2011, Carr was appointed Disciplinary Commissioner in proceedings before the International Criminal Court.

On 14 June 2013 Carr was appointed a High Court judge, receiving the customary appointment as a Dame Commander of The Most Excellent Order of the British Empire. She was assigned to the Queen's Bench Division. She is also a governing Bencher of the Honourable Society of the Inner Temple and a member of the board of the Judicial College. 

In 2020 Carr was appointed to the Court of Appeal of England and Wales with effect from 21 April 2020. She was sworn of the Privy Council on 28 April 2021.

Personal
Carr is a member of the Governing Council of Wycombe Abbey School.

Family
Carr is married to Alexander Birch. They have three children.

References

1964 births
Living people
Dames Commander of the Order of the British Empire
21st-century English judges
People educated at Wycombe Abbey
Alumni of Trinity College, Cambridge
Place of birth missing (living people)
English women judges
Lady Justices of Appeal
Queen's Bench Division judges
Members of the Privy Council of the United Kingdom